Bonnemaisonia asparagoides is a species of red alga in the family Bonnemaisoniaceae.

References 

Bonnemaisoniales